Church of SS Mary and Ambrose, Edgbaston is a Grade II listed parish church in the Church of England in Birmingham.

History
The site for the church was given by Augustus Gough-Calthorpe, 6th Baron Calthorpe. The church cost £8,000 with the parishioners contributing £2,000 and the Misses Stokes of the Hawthorns, Edgbaston, the balance. The church was consecrated by the Bishop of Worcester Rt. Revd. John Perone on 28 September 1898.

The church was built between 1897 and 1898 by J. A. Chatwin. It was a daughter parish to St Bartholomew's Church, Edgbaston.

Clergy
 1891–1915: Arthur G Lloyd
 1915–1950: Martin Cope Heathcote Hughes
 1950–1975: Alfred Doyle
 1975–1983: Nigel Graham
 1983–1988: Richard Wilcox
 1990–1994: John Ward
 1996–2002: Hilary Savage
 2004–2016: Catherine Grylls

Organ
The first organ in the church was built by J. W. Walker & Sons Ltd in 1898. A specification of the organ can be found on the National Pipe Organ Register.

Organists
W. Timperley ca. 1890
H.S. Williams ca. 1907
C.F. Mottram 1919 - ????
Geoffrey Norman Gibbon 1946 - 1948
Anthony John Cooke 1948 – 1949
Harrison Oxley 1949 - 1950
Geoffrey Norman Gibbons 1950 - 1961  (afterwards organist at Henley in Arden)
Malcolm Jones 1968 - ???? (formerly organist of St Philip's Church, Dorridge)
Anthony White 1983 - 1986
David Dewar 1989 - 1991

References

Churches completed in 1898
19th-century Church of England church buildings
Edgbaston
Grade II listed churches in Birmingham
Edgbaston
1898 establishments in England